Saros cycle series 107 for lunar eclipses occurred at the moon's descending node, 18 years 11 and 1/3 days. It contained 72 events.

See also 
 List of lunar eclipses
 List of Saros series for lunar eclipses

Notes

External links 
 www.hermit.org: Saros 107

Lunar saros series